Jouar el Haouz (Arabic: جوار الحوز; also spelled Jwar el Hoz) is a municipality in the Baabda District of the Mount Lebanon Governorate of Lebanon. It is located 36 kilometers east of Beirut. The municipality is member of Federation of Matn El Aala Municipalities.

Demography 
The inhabitants of Jouar el Haouz are members of the Maronite Catholic Church.

Etymology 
The name Jouar el Haouz has an Arabic origin consisting of 2 words, "Jouar" meaning "next to" and "el Haouz". There is no consensus on the origin of the word "Haouz" as it can have 2 different meanings: The first referring to a local variety of a tree called "Haouz" bringing the name of the village to "next to el Haouz /tree". The second referring to a "piece of land, or property" bringing the name of the village to "next to the property".

History 
In the 18th century, Jouar el Haouz was the property of the Emir Kaidbey Abillama. As such all the geographic, social, and economic origins of the village were directly related to the Emirs family.
After the Abillamas took control of the region, Christian families started moving into the village to work the fields by building agricultural farms, under what was known the "partnership" model. The welfare of those families started to improve after the conversion of the Emir to the Maronite faith.
The Chamoun family, from Tannourine, came to settle in Jouar el Haouz, and once the number of its members started to grow, they called upon a priest to cater for their religious needs. The priest "el Khoury" Philippos el Hage Boutros was asked accordingly to move to the village, coming from Sakiet el Misk / Bikfaya, along with some of his family members.

As such, mainly 2 families constitute the entire population of the village, the Chamoun and the Hage Boutros.

In the mid-19th century, Jouar el Haouz started being considered part of the "big Matn" area.

Economy 
Jouar el Haouz economy was formed, since its inception on agriculture, where the emirs family started by planting tobacco and mulberry. Following which manufacturing and trading evolved.
The Abillamas' built a tobacco factory, under the name "Abillama Bros." where their products were sold in Istanbul and Marseille and where they received quality recognition awards in 1875, 1918 and 1922.

Following the establishment of the "Regie Libanaise des Tabacs et Tombacs" in 1935, tobacco cultivations in the village were stopped.

The nature of plantations evolved until it settled on mainly apples and cherries, where Jouar el Haouz apples received an award in 1956 during the Damascus food trade show.
Several small factories and trading houses were developed accordingly.

Notable People from Jouar el Haouz 
 Emir Kaidbey Abillama- founder of the village.
 Toufic el Khoury- mukhtar, thanks to his efforts in 1948, the village was able to have access to a public school, and in 1951 to public electricity and landline.
 Fred Maroon- photographer, best known for his extensive coverage of the Nixon administration before, during and through the Watergate scandal.
 Takla Chamoun- actress, drama instructor, producer, and the co-founder and CEO of the Lebanese Film Academy.
 Kamil Tanios- film director and producer, worked for most popular TV stations in Lebanon and the Arab world.
 Charles Khoury- painter, member of the Salon d’Automne of the Sursock Museum, the International Association of Fine Arts - Unesco in Paris, and the Association of Lebanese Artists.

Religious Structure 
Saint John the Baptist church- built in 1922

Citations

References 

Populated places in Baabda District